Taikkyi Township is the northernmost township of Yangon Region.
Taikkyi township constitutes three main towns: Taikkyi, Oakkan, Aphauk. Yangon-Pyay Road and Yangon-Pyay railway cross Taikkyi from North to South. Taikkyi is made of eight quarters : Inngalar, Shanzu, Oakponezu, Bawdhigone, Mingalar, Bootar, Odann, Zay. Two main high schools in Taikkyi are BEHS-Taikkyi and BEHS (Myoma)-Taikkyi.

References

Townships of Yangon Region